Phu Tho Football Club is a professional football club in Vietnam based in Viet Tri city, Phu Tho province, currently playing in V.League 2. The home ground is Việt Trì Stadium.

History
In October 2019, the Chairman of Phu Tho Provincial People's Committee made a decision to establish Tuan Tu Phu Tho football team to participate in the competition from the Vietnamese National Football Third League. Tuan Tu Phu Tho operates under professional football regulations. , register as a member of the Vietnam Football Federation. At the beginning, the team had 25 players aged 18–20 with the core being young players of Song Lam Nghe An. Leading the team is coach Ho Thanh Thuong.

Football clubs in Vietnam